Korcabulaq is a village in the Lachin District of Azerbaijan.

History 
The village was located in the Armenian-occupied territories surrounding Nagorno-Karabakh, coming under the control of ethnic Armenian forces during the First Nagorno-Karabakh War in the early 1990s, subsequently becoming part of the breakaway Republic of Artsakh as part of its Kashatagh Province, where it was known as Aghbradzor. The village was returned to Azerbaijan as part of the 2020 Nagorno-Karabakh ceasefire agreement.

Historical heritage sites 
Historical heritage sites in and around the village include a burial mound from the 2nd–1st millennia BCE, a khachkar from 1068, a khachkar from 1069, a khachkar from 1075, an 11th-century khachkar on a pedestal, the 11th/12th-century monastery church of Mayrejri Vank, three 11th/12th-century khachkars, an 11th/12th-century defensive wall, the cemetery of Mayrejri Vank from between the 11th and 17th centuries, four 12th/13th-century khachkars, a 12th/13th-century tombstone, a khachkar from 1244, a 13th-century khachkar, a 15th-century khachkar, a 16th/17th-century tombstone, and a tombstone from 1641.

References

External links 

Villages in Azerbaijan
Populated places in Lachin District